Colorado Springs Christian Schools is a 501c3 private Christian school system in the cities of  Colorado Springs, Colorado and Woodland Park, Colorado. It has a "​Colorado Springs Campus" at 4855 Mallow Road, and​​ a "Woodland Park Campus", at 1003 Tamarac Parkway.  It includes Pre-K to high school level education.  It has two middle schools and includes Colorado Springs Christian High School.

It was founded in 1971.

As has happened for many private schools, CSCS has grown during COVID-19. CSCS re-opened earlier than public schools in its area. CSCS' students' problems dealing with Covid were addressed in a 2021 event.

The Woodland Park campus was opened in 2005 as a K-5 school, and added 6th, 7th, and 8th grade levels successively in 2019, 2020, 2021.

Notable alumni

 Zach Filkins, lead guitarist of pop rock band OneRepublic
 Nichole Nordeman, singer-songwriter
 Ryan Tedder, lead vocalist of OneRepublic. Filkins and Tedder were students in their senior year at CSCS when they joined up to form their first band, which evolved into OneRepublic.

References

External links

1972 establishments in Colorado
Christian schools in Colorado
Educational institutions established in 1972
High schools in Colorado Springs, Colorado
Private high schools in Colorado
Private middle schools in Colorado
Private elementary schools in Colorado
Schools in Colorado Springs, Colorado